For Your Eyes Only is a collection of short stories by the British author Ian Fleming, featuring the fictional British Secret Service agent Commander James Bond, the eighth book to feature the character. It was first published by Jonathan Cape on April 11 April 1960. It marked a change of format for Fleming, who had previously written James Bond stories only as full-length novels.

The collection contains five short stories: "From a View to a Kill", "For Your Eyes Only", "Quantum of Solace", "Risico" and "The Hildebrand Rarity". Four of the stories were adaptations of plots for a television series that was never filmed, while the fifth Fleming had written previously but not published. Fleming undertook some minor experiments with the format, including a story written as an homage to W. Somerset Maugham, an author he greatly admired.

Elements from the stories have been used in a number of the Eon Productions James Bond film series, including the 1981 film, For Your Eyes Only, starring Roger Moore as James Bond. The film used some elements and characters from the short stories "For Your Eyes Only" and "Risico". "From a View to a Kill" also gave part of its title (but no characters or plot elements) to the fourteenth Bond film, A View to a Kill (1985), while plot elements from "The Hildebrand Rarity" were used in the sixteenth Bond film, Licence to Kill (1989). "Quantum of Solace" was used as the title for the twenty-second Bond film.

Plots

"From a View to a Kill" 
Bond investigates the murder of a motorcycle dispatch-rider and the theft of his top-secret documents by a motorcycle-riding assassin. The dispatch-rider was en route from SHAPE, the Supreme Headquarters Allied Powers Europe, then located in Versailles, to his base, Station F, in Saint-Germain, France. Since Bond is already in Paris, his superior, M, sends him to assist in the investigation in any way he can. Bond disguises himself as a dispatch-rider and follows the same route to Station F as the previous rider. As expected, the assassin attempts to kill Bond. Bond, however, is ready and kills the assassin. He then uncovers the assassin's hidden base of operations.

"For Your Eyes Only" 
"For Your Eyes Only" begins with the murder of the Havelocks, a British couple in Jamaica who have refused to sell their estate to Herr von Hammerstein, a former Gestapo officer who is the chief of counterintelligence for the Cuban secret service. They are killed by two Cuban hitmen at the direction of their leader, Major Gonzales; all three work for von Hammerstein. The Havelocks turn out to be close friends of M, who served as the groom's best man during their wedding in 1925. M subsequently gives Bond a voluntary assignment, unconnected to sanctioned Secret Service duties; to travel to Vermont via Canada, find von Hammerstein at his rented estate at Echo Lake and assassinate him as a warning to future criminals who might think to target British citizens. When Bond arrives on the scene, he finds the Havelocks' daughter, Judy, who intends to carry out her own mission of revenge with a bow and arrow. A shoot-out then occurs between Bond and Gonzales and the two Cuban gunmen. Bond kills all of them and returns to Canada with Judy, who has been wounded during the gunfight.

"Quantum of Solace" 
After completing a mission in the Bahamas, Bond is in Nassau and attends a disappointing dinner party at Government House. When the other guests have left, Bond remarks that if he ever marries, he imagines it would be nice to marry an air hostess. The Governor then tells Bond the story of a relationship between a former civil servant, Philip Masters and air hostess Rhoda Llewellyn. After meeting aboard a flight to London, the couple married and went to live in Bermuda, but Rhoda eventually began a long open affair with the eldest son of a rich Bermudian family. As a result, Masters' work deteriorated, and he suffered a nervous breakdown. After recovering, he was given a break from Bermuda by the governor and sent on an assignment to Washington. Upon his return Masters was determined to end his marriage and he divided their home into two sections, half to each of them and refused to have anything to do with his wife in private—although they continued to appear as a couple in public. He eventually returned to the UK alone, leaving Rhoda with unpaid debts and stranded in Bermuda—a cruel act which he would have been incapable of carrying out just a few months earlier. The governor explains his point to Bond: when the "Quantum of Solace" drops to zero, humanity and consideration of one human for another is gone and the relationship is finished. Despite the success of Masters' plan to take revenge on his unfaithful wife, he never recovered emotionally. After a time, Rhoda married a rich Canadian. The governor then reveals that the dinner companions whom Bond found dull were in fact Rhoda and her husband. The governor hinting that Bond should have a quantum of solace for what they went through.

"Risico" 
Bond is sent by M to investigate a drug-smuggling operation based in Italy that is sending narcotics to England. M instructs Bond to get in touch with a CIA informant, Kristatos, who in turn tells Bond that a man named Enrico Colombo is behind the racket. When Bond sets out to find more information on Colombo, he is captured and brought aboard Colombo's ship, the Colombina. Colombo informs Bond that Kristatos is actually the one in charge of the drug smuggling operation, and that Kristatos is backed by the Russians. Colombo agrees to help Bond by providing information about things "as long as none of it comes back to Italy"; Bond agrees to help Colombo eliminate Kristatos. Bond, Colombo and his men sail the Colombina to Santa Maria where Kristatos's men are in the process of loading another shipment of drugs. They attack Kristatos's ship and adjacent warehouse and discover Kristatos lurking near the warehouse, preparing to detonate a bomb. Kristatos tries to escape, but is killed by Bond.

"The Hildebrand Rarity" 

Bond is on an assignment in the Seychelles Islands; through Fidèle Barbey, his influential and well-connected local contact, he meets an uncouth American millionaire, Milton Krest, who challenges the two to aid him in the search for a rare fish, the Hildebrand Rarity. Bond, Barbey, Krest and his English wife, Elizabeth, set off aboard Krest's boat, Wavekrest, in search of the fish. During the journey, Bond learns that Milton verbally and physically abuses everyone around him, especially his wife—whom he punishes with the use of a stingray tail he dubs "The Corrector". Krest finds the Hildebrand Rarity and kills it—along with many other fish—by pouring poison into the water. Wavekrest sets sail for port. Along the way Krest gets very drunk, insults Bond and Barbey and tells his wife he will beat her again with the stingray tail. Later that night, Bond hears Krest choking; investigating, Bond finds that Krest has been murdered—apparently by having the rare fish stuffed down his throat. So as not to be entangled in a murder investigation, Bond throws Krest overboard and cleans up the scene of the crime, making it look as though Krest fell overboard after one of the ropes holding his hammock broke: Bond suspects both Barbey and Mrs. Krest, but is unsure which is responsible.

Characters and themes
Continuation Bond author Raymond Benson notes that two of the stories ("Quantum of Solace" and "The Hildebrand Rarity") are experimental for Fleming, while the remaining three are straightforward Bond adventures. In the two experimental stories Bond is given something of a more human side, with "Quantum of Solace" evidencing Bond's reaction to the Governor's story by showing a compassionate side, as he sees the real life of Philip Masters and Rhoda Llewellyn as being more dramatic than his recent mission; the forthcoming trip he has to make to the CIA, he now sees as "dull and unexciting". In "The Hildebrand Rarity", Bond is also shown with a humanitarian side, with feelings for the plight of Liz at the hands of her husband and for the use of the poison on the fish by Milton Krest.

An aspect of Bond's relationship with M is shown in "For Your Eyes Only", with Bond taking the decision from M's shoulders about what should happen to the murderers of M's friends, the Havelocks; the scene also shows the reader about the weight of command and M's indecision as to what path to follow. The daughter of M's friends, Judy Havelock, is a tough and resourceful character, according to Benson, although after she has avenged her parents' death and is wounded, she softens and allows Bond to take up his usual role of protector.

In "Risico", academic Christoph Lindner identifies the character of Enrico Colombo as an example of those characters who have morals closer to those of the traditional villains, but who act on the side of good in support of Bond; others of this type include Darko Kerim (From Russia, with Love), Tiger Tanaka (You Only Live Twice) and Marc-Ange Draco (On Her Majesty's Secret Service).

World War II again makes an appearance in the stories: in For Your Eyes Only, Von Hammerstein is a former Gestapo officer, whilst the RCMP officer, Colonel Johns, served with the British under Montgomery in the Eighth Army. In "The Hildebrand Rarity", Milton Krest is of German descent, and in "Risico", both Enrico Colombo and Aristotle Kristatos fought for the British in the war.

Justice and revenge are themes that run through two of the stories. In "For Your Eyes Only" the idea of revenge is looked at from a number of angles: Bond's, M's and Judy Havelock's, and each has a different interpretation. Bond's approach to killing is also dissected in "For Your Eyes Only", while the morality of killing is a theme in "The Hildebrand Rarity".

Background
In the summer of 1958, CBS television commissioned Fleming to write episodes of a television show based on the James Bond character. This deal came about after the success of the 1954 television adaptation of Casino Royale as an episode of the CBS television series Climax!. Fleming agreed to the deal, and began to write outlines for the series; however, CBS later dropped the idea. In January and February 1959 Fleming adapted four of these television plots into short stories at his Goldeneye estate in Jamaica and added a fifth story he had written in the summer of 1958. Fleming biographer Andrew Lycett noted that at the time Fleming was writing both the television scripts, and the short story collection, "Ian's mood of weariness and self-doubt was beginning to affect his writing" and this can be seen in Bond's internal monologue of thoughts.

"From a View to a Kill"
"From a View to a Kill" was initially intended to be the backstory for Hugo Drax, the villain of the novel Moonraker. The story would have taken place during World War II, and featured Drax as the motorcycle assassin who crashes his bike and is taken to an American field hospital. Later, the hospital is bombed, leaving Drax with amnesia and a disfigured face. The story was one that Fleming had drawn up for the television series. The SHAPE head of security, Colonel Schreiber, was designed to be the antithesis of Bond, with greying hair, the air of a bank manager, desk with silver framed photographs of his family and a single white rose; the description shows Fleming using colour to show Schreiber's lack of colour and personality. The idea of the underground hideout was inspired by Fleming's brother Peter's band of Auxiliary Units who dug tunnel networks in Britain in 1940 as part of a resistance movement in advance of a German invasion. The original name for the story was "The Rough with the Smooth", which was also the original title of the books, before For Your Eyes Only was chosen for publication.

"For Your Eyes Only"
The story was originally entitled Man's Work and was set in Vermont, where Fleming had spent a number of summers at his friend Ivar Bryce's Black Hollow Farm, which became the model for von Hammerstein's hideaway, Echo Lake. The name of the villain of the story, Von Hammerstein, was taken from General Baron Kurt von Hammerstein-Equord (1878–1943), one of Hitler's opponents. Fleming also considered calling the story "Death Leaves an Echo" and based the story on "Rough Justice", which was to be episode three of the television series.

"Quantum of Solace"

"Quantum of Solace" was based on a story told to Fleming by his neighbour and lover Blanche Blackwell about a real-life police inspector Fleming portrayed as a civil servant, Philip Masters. As thanks for the inspiration, Fleming bought Blackwell a Cartier watch. Fleming paid homage to a writer he greatly admired, W Somerset Maugham, by writing the story in Maugham's style. The format—a private conversation between an agent and a high-ranking diplomat about socially unequal romance—is taken from Maugham's short story "His Excellency". "Quantum of Solace" was first published in the May 1959 issue of Cosmopolitan in the US, and then in the UK in Modern Woman's Magazine of November 1959.

"Risico"
In 1958 Fleming holidayed with his wife Ann in Venice and at the Lido peninsula; Fleming was a great admirer of Thomas Mann's work Death in Venice, which was based on the Lido and the Flemings visited it for that reason, using the location as the backdrop for "Risico". For the love interest in the story, Lisl, Fleming used the name of an ex-girlfriend from Kitzbühel in Austria, where he had travelled in the 1930s. For the name of Colombo, Fleming borrowed the surname of Gioacchino Colombo, the Ferrari engine designer.

"The Hildebrand Rarity"
In April 1958 Fleming flew to the Seychelles via Bombay to report for The Sunday Times on a treasure hunt; although the hunt was not as exciting as he hoped, Fleming used many of the details of the island for "The Hildebrand Rarity". Fleming combined the backdrop of the Seychelles with his experience he and Blanche Blackwell had undergone when they had visited Pedro Keys, two islands off Jamaica, and watched two scientists do something similar with poison to obtain samples. For the villain of the story, an abusive American millionaire, Fleming used the name Milton Krest: Milton was the code name of a Greek sea captain who ferried British soldiers and agents through German patrols and who received the Distinguished Service Order and an MBE, whilst Krest was the name of tonic and ginger beer Fleming drank in Seychelles. "The Hildebrand Rarity" was first published in Playboy in March 1960.

Release and reception

For Your Eyes Only was published on 11 April 1960 in the UK as a hardcover edition by publishers Jonathan Cape; it was 252 pages long and cost fifteen shillings. The subtitle, Five Secret Occasions in the Life of James Bond, was added for publication; 21,712 copies were printed and quickly sold out. For Your Eyes Only was published in the US in August 1960 by Viking Press and the subtitle was changed to Five Secret Exploits of James Bond; in later editions, it was dropped altogether.

Artist Richard Chopping once again provided the cover art for the book. On 18 March 1959 Fleming had written to Chopping about the cover he had undertaken for Goldfinger, saying that: "The new jacket is quite as big a success as the first one and I do think [Jonathan] Cape have made a splendid job of it". Moving on to For Your Eyes Only, Fleming said "I am busily scratching my head trying to think of a subject for you again. No one in the history of thrillers has had such a totally brilliant artistic collaborator!"

Reviews
Francis Iles, writing in The Guardian, noting the short-story format, "thought it better than the novels" and wrote that "the first story is full of the old wild improbabilities, but one of the others has a positively Maughamish flavour." Iles also thought that "it seems that one must either enjoy the novels of Mr. Ian Fleming beyond reason or be unable to read them at all." Writing in The Guardians sister paper, The Observer, Maurice Richardson thought that "our Casanovaesque cad-clubman secret agent is mellowing a bit now"; Richardson liked the format, saying that "the short form suits him quite well" although the downside is that "if it checks the wilder fantasies it cuts short the love-affairs". Writing in The Spectator, Cyril Ray (under the pseudonym Christopher Pym) wrote that "each episode of the Bond novels meant the adventure was less probable and more preposterous than the last, and now our hero seems to have lost, as well as any claims to plausibility, the know-how, the know-who, know-what and sheer zing that used to carry the unlikely plots along. Perhaps all that mattress pounding is taking it out of poor Bond".

Writing in The Listener, John Raymond was of the opinion that Bond's "admirers ... will find him in top form" and that the stories, "all but one of which are well up to 007's high standard". Raymond believed that "The Commander seems to be mellowing with the years" and because of this was "less of a show-off ... and, for once, his chronicler has almost cut out the sadism". In terms of the villains in the book, most notably Milton Krest, Raymond saw that Fleming's "capacity to create villains is undiminished".

The critic for The Times reflected that "the mood of For Your Eyes Only is, in fact, a good deal more sober and, perhaps, weary than before"; the critic also thought that the short form worked well with Bond, and that "the girls, though a short story allows them only walk-on parts, are as wild and luscious as ever". Philip Stead, writing in The Times Literary Supplement thought that "Mr. Fleming's licensed assassin is in pretty good form." Stead considered that in the stories "occasionally there seem to be echoes of Ashenden and glimpses of Rogue Male, but the Bond ambience is persuasive".

In the US, James Sandoe, writing in the New York Herald Tribune thought that For Your Eyes Only had "urban savagery and mighty smooth tale-spinning". Writing in The New York Times, Anthony Boucher—described by a Fleming biographer, John Pearson as "throughout an avid anti-Bond and an anti-Fleming man"—described what his main issue with Fleming's work was: "his basic weakness as a storyteller, which can be summed up in two words: 'no story.'" In the short story form, however, Boucher finds that Bond's tales "are proportionate" and that Fleming's "prose ... is eminently smooth and readable" even if "Bond's triumphs are too simple and lack ... intricate suspense".

Adaptations

Comic strip (1961–1967)
Four of the five short stories in For Your Eyes Only were adapted into comic strips published in the British newspaper Daily Express and subsequently syndicated around the world. The first three stories were adapted by Henry Gammidge and illustrated by John McLusky and appeared in the newspaper between 3 April 1961 and 9 December 1961. All three comics were published again in 2005 as part of the Dr. No anthology by Titan Books. The fourth adaptation, "The Hildebrand Rarity", did not appear until six years after the comic-strip versions of the other stories. It was adapted by Jim Lawrence and illustrated by Yaroslav Horak. This adaptation was reprinted by Titan Books in 2009 as part of Volume 2 of the James Bond Omnibus collection.

Films

For Your Eyes Only (1981)
A number of details from the story are used in the film For Your Eyes Only, released in 1981 and starring Roger Moore as James Bond. The film shows the murder of the Havelocks—a marine archaeologist and his wife—by a hit man, although it names the hitman as Gonzalez, rather than Gonzales. The film also changes the name of the Havelock's daughter, Judy, to Melina. For Your Eyes Only also uses much of the plot of "Risico", including the characters of Colombo and Kristatos.

A View to a Kill (1985)
Part of the title of the story From a View to a Kill was used for the 1985 Bond film A View to a Kill, with none of the story used in this or any other film to date.

Licence to Kill (1989)
Milton Krest, his foundation, the Wavekrest and "the Corrector" from "The Hildebrand Rarity" were incorporated into the 1989 film Licence to Kill.

Quantum of Solace (2008)
Quantum of Solace was chosen as the title of the 22nd Bond film; none of the story was used for the film's plot. Daniel Craig, who starred as Bond in the film, said the film also shares the primary thematic element of the story as "it relates to the fact that if you don't have that Quantum of Solace in a relationship, you should give up. If you are not respecting each other, it's over, and at the end of the last movie Bond doesn't have that because his girlfriend has been killed."

Spectre (2015)
In the 2015 film Spectre M and Bond meet in a London safe house, which carries a name plate labelled "Hildebrand Antiques and Rarities", a reference to The Hildebrand Rarity.

See also

 List of James Bond novels and short stories
 Outline of James Bond

References

Bibliography

External links
 
 Ian Fleming Publications

1960 short story collections
Short story collections by Ian Fleming
Thriller short story collections
James Bond books
For Your Eyes Only (film)
Licence to Kill
A View to a Kill
Quantum of Solace
Jonathan Cape books